Michel Taylor "Tate" Armstrong (born October 5, 1955) is a retired American basketball player.

A 6'3" guard from Duke University, Armstrong won a gold medal with the United States national basketball team at the 1976 Summer Olympics.  He was selected by the Chicago Bulls with the 13th pick of the 1977 NBA Draft and played two years with the Bulls, averaging 3.8 points, 1.1 assists, and 1.0 rebounds per game.
He is currently a real estate developer in the DC area and has seven children.

External links
Duke Stats

1955 births
Living people
American men's basketball players
Basketball players at the 1976 Summer Olympics
Basketball players from Georgia (U.S. state)
Chicago Bulls draft picks
Chicago Bulls players
Duke Blue Devils men's basketball players
Olympic gold medalists for the United States in basketball
Medalists at the 1976 Summer Olympics
People from Moultrie, Georgia
Point guards
Shooting guards
United States men's national basketball team players